is a Japanese physiologist, sports scientist and writer. He is also the founder and the former head of the Japanese learned society .

Mori was originally known for his physiology researches, but began to write books about human neuroscience, coining the term "game brain" in his 2002 book . He claimed that the brains of people who played video games were physically damaged. Game Nō no Kyōfu received much attention from critics such as Tamaki Saitō.

Mori's activities expanded into other genres such as journalism and politics due to the popularity of his books, though his theory about human brains was pointed out to be pseudoscientific. Japanese critic Hiroo Yamagata compared the book Game Nō no Kyōfu with the following movement of Messages from Water because those theories became popular via Japanese mass media without scientific backgrounds.

Life and career

1969–2002: Early career and research
Born in Hokkaidō, Mori graduated from the College of Humanities and Sciences of the Nihon University in 1969 and graduated from the Graduate School of Literatures of the Nihon University in 1971. Getting the academic degree Doctor of Medicine, he became a professor of the Nihon University, though he toured the Rockefeller University as a researcher and the Queen's University as a visiting scholar before that.

Originally, Mori was known for his many scientific researches about cats' physiology such as the collaborative work "Input-output relationships in cat's motor cortex after pyramidal section" released in 1981, the collaborative work "Low threshold motor effects produced by stimulation of area preinsularis (2pr.i) of the secondary sensory cortex in the cat; Input-output relationships" released in 1983, the collaborative work "Physiological properties and patterns of projection in the cortico-cortical connections from the second somatosensory cortex to the motor cortex, area 4 gamma, in the cat" released in 1989, the collaborative work "Fifth somatosensory cortex (SV) representation of the whole body surface in the medial bank of the anterior suprasylvian sulcus of the cat" released in 1991, the collaborative work "Low-threshold motor effects produced by stimulation of the facial area of the fifth somatosensory cortex in the cat" released in 1993, the collaborative work "The ipsilateral and contralateral connections of the fifth somatosensory area (SV) in the cat cerebral cortex" released in 1996, and his solo work "Cortico-cortical connections from somatosensory areas to the motor area of the cortex following peripheral nerve lesion in the cat" released in 1997.

On March 26, 2000, Mori was awarded the commendation certificate  by the Nihon University for working with the University for 30 years. He also researched the human actions of sports such as kendo along with two other researchers, announcing the collaborative work "Two types of movement-related cortical potentials preceding wrist extension in humans" via the journal NeuroReport in July 2001. He established the Japanese Society of Health and Behavior Sciences in 2002, becoming the board chairperson of the society. It was later admitted as an associated party by the Japanese scientific organization, Science Council of Japan, on April 13, 2006.

Mori attained the degree of Doctor of Medicine, but did not become interested in researching the relationships between video games and human neuroscience until he met a programmer of computer software around 2000 when he made a new electroencephalograph.

2002–present: Literary career and political activities
On July 10, 2002, the Japan Broadcast Publishing (or NHK Shuppan) published the independent book Game Nō no Kyōfu, written by Mori, as a part of the  series. Additionally, the book was translated into traditional Chinese characters under the title Xiao Xin Dian Wan Nao! in 2005. Mori commenced research into the effects of video games on a child's mind. He has cited various violent crime committed by juveniles who played video games to support his position. His position is that playing video games can cause damage to a child's brain, but the theory was heavily criticized.

In 2004, Mori also claimed that the brains of people who used mobile e-mails were also damaged, calling those .

On October 19, 2004, the Computer Entertainment Supplier's Association announced that the neuroscientific works of Mori and Ryuta Kawashima about video games had insufficient evidence to claim something. In 2005, however, Mori and Kawashima took part in a series of convocations, held by the Ministry of Education, Culture, Sports, Science and Technology of Japan as a part of its activities for creating its guidelines of Japanese schools' operation.

In addition, Mori's book , published on August 1, 2006, was selected as the Japan National Council of Parent-Teacher Association's "recommended book" at that time.

Mori also recommend Iida Denshi's Nōchō series highly as intelligible goods with his research. The series are CDs recording the speeches such as Heart Sutra and won the creative award at the Utsukushima Monozukuri awards presented by Fukushima Prefecture in January 2007.

In 2008, Mori resigned from the head of the Japanese Society of Health and Behavior Sciences, being replaced by Shinji Murakami of Hokkaido University.

On April 16, 2008, Senichi Club, a communication club comprising the readers of Sekai Nippō, the Japanese division of the World Times, invited Mori over a lecture meeting at Shibuya, in which Mori cited India as an advanced country of information technology.

Since the professors in different fields such as literatures took part in the brain science when the theory of game brain was becoming popular, the Japan Neuroscience Society announced the new ethical code on January 8, 2010, seeking the scientific sources against the groundless theories.

Published works

Independent books
Mori, Akio (July 2002).  (Japan Broadcast Publishing) 
Mori, Akio (July 2004).  (Kodansha) 
Mori, Akio (August 2006).  (Juniors' Visual Journal) 
Mori, Akio (September 2007).  (PHP Institute)

Journal articles

See also
Game brain
Ryuta Kawashima
Masaru Emoto
Video game controversy

References

1947 births
Living people
Nihon University alumni
People from Hokkaido
Japanese physiologists
Sports scientists